Gentleman Joe Palooka is a 1946 film directed by Cy Endfield. It was the second of the Joe Palooka series.

Plot

The prizefighter Joe Palooka's popularity soars after his manager, Knobby Walsh, explains to reporters how "clean living" is responsible for Joe's success. The public is pleased with a hero who believes in drinking milk.

Joe's rich and unscrupulous Uncle Charlie sees a way to capitalize on Joe's good fortune. He schemes to make a land purchase, trading on Joe's good name, then blackmails Joe and Knobby once they figure out how they're being used. Joe's sweetheart Anne Howe tries to intervene as a legislative investigation of the land swindle begins, and Joe outfoxes thugs employed by Charlie to get to the hearings just in time and clear his name.

Cast
 Leon Errol as Knobby
 Joe Kirkwood, Jr. as Joe Palooka
 Elyse Knox as Anne
 Lionel Stander as Harry
 Guy Kibbee as Charlie
 Sarah Padden as Mom Palooka

External links
 Gentleman Joe Palooka at IMDb
 Gentleman Joe Palooka at TCMDB

1946 films
1940s sports films
American black-and-white films
American boxing films
Monogram Pictures films
Films based on American comics
1940s American films
Joe Palooka films